Nobel Prizes have been awarded to over 900 individuals, of whom at least 20% were Jews. The number of Jews receiving Nobel prizes has been the subject of some attention. Israeli academics Elay Ben-Gal and Yeshayahu Leibowitz began an encyclopedia of Jewish Nobel laureates, and have interviewed as many as possible about their life and work.

Jews have been recipients of all six awards. The first Jewish recipient, Adolf von Baeyer, was awarded the prize in Chemistry in 1905.

Jewish laureates Elie Wiesel and Imre Kertész survived the extermination camps during the Holocaust, while François Englert survived by being hidden in orphanages and children's homes. Others, such as Walter Kohn, Otto Stern, Albert Einstein, Hans Krebs and Martin Karplus had to flee Nazi Germany to avoid persecution. Still others, including Rita Levi-Montalcini, Herbert Hauptman, Robert Furchgott, Arthur Kornberg, and Jerome Karle experienced significant antisemitism in their careers.

Arthur Ashkin, a 96-year-old American Jew, was, at the time of his award, the oldest person to receive a Nobel Prize.

Chemistry

Physiology or Medicine

Physics

Literature

Economics

Peace

Forced to decline prize 
Boris Pasternak, a Russian Jew, who was awarded the 1958 prize for literature, initially accepted the award, but—after intense pressure from Soviet authorities—subsequently declined it.

Jewish laureates per country 
Below is a chart of all Jewish Nobel laureates per country (updated to 2022 laureates). Some laureates are counted more than once if have multiple citizenship.

Nobel Laureates Boulevard 

The Israeli city of Rishon LeZion has an avenue dedicated to honoring all Jewish Nobel laureates. The street, called Tayelet Hatanei Pras Nobel (Nobel Laureates Boulevard/Promenade), has a monument with attached plaque for each Nobel laureate. The scientific adviser of the project was Prof. Israel Hanukoglu.

See also 
 List of Nobel laureates
 List of Muslim Nobel laureates
 List of Christian Nobel laureates
 List of black Nobel laureates
 List of Israeli Nobel laureates

References

Further reading 
 Charpa, Ulrich; Deichmann, Ute. (eds.) (2007). Jews and Sciences in German Contexts: Case Studies From the 19th and 20th Centuries, Mohr Siebeck, pp. 23–25.
 Feldman, Burton (2001). The Nobel Prize: A History of Genius, Controversy, and Prestige, Arcade Publishing, pp. 407–10.
 Julius, Anthony (1995). T. S. Eliot, Anti-Semitism, and Literary Form, Cambridge University Press, p. 266.
 Lazarus, William P.; Sullivan, Mark. (2008). Comparative Religion For Dummies, Wiley Publishing, p. 45.
 Levitan, Tina (1960). The Laureates: Jewish Winners of the Nobel prize, Twayne Publishers (New York), 236 pages.
 Patai, Raphael (1996). The Jewish Mind, Wayne State University Press, pp. 339–42.
 Rubinstein, W. D. (1982). The Left, the Right and the Jews, Croom Helm, p. 63.
 Scharfstein, Sol (1999). Understanding Jewish Holidays and Customs: Historical and Contemporary, KTAV Publishing House, p. 168.
 Weiss, Mosheh (2004). A Brief History of the Jewish People, Rowman & Littlefield, pp. 216–17.
 Zuckerman, Harriet (1996). Scientific Elite: Nobel Laureates in the United States, Transaction Publishers, originally publishing in 1977, pp. 71–78.

External links 
 Nobel Luminaries Project – The Museum of the Jewish People at Beit Hatfutsot
 Video by the National Museum of American Jewish History with some Jewish Nobel laureates listed
 JINFO – Jewish Nobel Prize Winners

Nobel laureates
Judaism
Jewish